Daniela Bártová-Břečková (born 6 May 1974) is a retired Czech athlete. She was born in Ostrava. Originally a gymnast, her coach persuaded her to be a pole vaulter. She set nine world records in the mid-1990s, but she lost it on 4 November 1995 to Sun Caiyun and was unable to recapture it. Her personal best is 4.51 m (Bratislava, Slovakia, 9 June 1998).

Despite her success she only won one international medal, a silver medal at the 1998 European Indoor Championships.

As a gymnast, she represented the Czech Republic at the 1991 World Artistic Gymnastics Championships, placing 33rd in the all-around event, also took part in the all-around team event at the 1992 Summer Olympics.

Bártová is married to flatwater canoer Jan Břečka.

World records
4.12 m – Duisburg, Germany, 18 June 1995
4.13 m – Wesel, Germany, 24 June 1995
4.14 m – Gateshead, England, 2 July 1995
4.15 m – Ostrava, Czech Republic, 6 July 1995
4.16 m – Feldkirch, Austria, 14 July 1995
4.17 m – Feldkirch, Austria, 15 July 1995 
4.20 m – Cologne, Germany, 18 August 1995
4.21 m – Linz, Austria, 22 August 1995
4.22 m – Salgotarjan, Hungary, 11 September 1995

Competition record

References

External links
 Fan site
 

1974 births
Living people
Czech female artistic gymnasts
Czech female pole vaulters
Olympic gymnasts of Czechoslovakia
Gymnasts at the 1992 Summer Olympics
Olympic athletes of the Czech Republic
Athletes (track and field) at the 2000 Summer Olympics
World record setters in athletics (track and field)
World Athletics Championships athletes for the Czech Republic
Sportspeople from Ostrava
Competitors at the 1998 Goodwill Games